The Dagenham idol is a wooden statue of a naked human figure, found in Dagenham in 1922. The statue has been carbon dated to around 2250 BC, during the late Neolithic period or early Bronze Age, making it one of the oldest human representations found in Europe.

It has two legs but no arms; hips and buttocks narrowing to a waist and then broadening to shoulders; and a rounded head. There are straight markings cut across both legs. A hole in the pubic region can be interpreted as indicating a female, but with the insertion of a phallic peg (now lost) would indicate a male. 

The statue was found in marshland on the north bank of the River Thames to the east of London, south of Ripple Road in Dagenham, during excavation for sewer pipes in 1922, now on the site of Ford Dagenham. The statue may have been buried with the deer as a votive fertility sacrifice.
 
The original statue is owned by Colchester Castle Museum, with a copy in the Museum of London. The original went on indefinite loan to Valence House Museum in Dagenham in 2010.

See also 
 Broddenbjerg idol
 Anthropomorphic wooden cult figurines of Central and Northern Europe

References 
 Rippleside, Barking & Dagenham, Hidden London
 Calls for 4,000-year-old idol to stay in Dagenham – its ‘rightful home’, Barking & Dagenham Post, 22 September 2011 
 Early history of Barking and Dagenham, London Borough of Barking and Dagenham
 Early Celtic Art, p. 16
 Replica at the Museum of London

23rd-century BC works
3rd-millennium BC sculptures
1922 archaeological discoveries
Archaeological discoveries in the United Kingdom
Archaeology of England
Figurines
Prehistoric Britain
Prehistoric sculpture
Dagenham
Nude sculptures in the United Kingdom
Wooden sculptures in the United Kingdom
Late Neolithic
Odin in art